Orthocomotis herbacea is a species of moth of the family Tortricidae. It is found from Guatemala and Costa Rica to Ecuador (Pichincha Province, Loja Province) and Venezuela.

Larvae have been reared on Persea americana.

References

Moths described in 1956
Orthocomotis